"" ("Oh, how joyful", literally: "Oh, you joyful ... [Christmastime]") is a German Christmas carol. The author of the original text was the prominent Weimar "orphan father" Johannes Daniel Falk (1768–1826), who set his lyric to the anonymous hymn-tune "O Sanctissima" (O most holy). Shortly after Falk's death, his former assistant  (1798–1847) from Wunsiedel completed the set of three verses that are sung today.

Original song
In late 1815 or early 1816, he dedicated this song to the children of the orphanage. The melody was taken from the anonymous Catholic hymn "O Sanctissima" (also known as "Sicilian Mariners Hymn"), which he found in the posthumous edition of J.G. Herder's  after hearing it sung by Pietro Granucci, an Italian foundling under his care. In Falk's original text, the song was titled "" (A song for three holidays), highlighting the three major festivals of Christianity: Christmas, Easter and Pentecost.

Original text

Today's text
The song became famous as a Christmas carol that took its first verse verbatim from Johannes Daniel Falk. The second and third verses were partially rewritten in 1826 by Heinrich Holzschuher, a former assistant to Falk. The song's current form (with some regional differences in the text) is:

The hymn has been translated into many languages, including English ("O, how joyfully"), French, Latin, Swedish ("O du saliga, o du heliga"), Norwegian ("Å du heilage, nådeberande"), Czech ("Ó ty radostný čase vánoční"), and Esperanto ("Feliĉega vi, ĉarmoplena vi").

Melody

Religious use and importance
The song is used in the current German Protestant hymnal  (EG 44), in various regional editions of the German Catholic Gotteslob, in the Free Church  (F&L 220) and in the Mennonite  (MG 264). In the Protestant churches of Germany, the song is traditionally sung at the end of Christmas Eve services.

See also
 List of Christmas carols

References

External links

, Regensburger Domspatzen
, Elisabeth Schwarzkopf, Ambrosian Singers, Philharmonia Orchestra, Charles Mackerras

German-language Christmas carols
Christmas in Germany
19th-century hymns in German
1816 songs
1826 songs